The 1997–98 Algerian Cup was the 33rd edition of the Algerian Cup. WA Tlemcen won the Cup by defeating MC Oran 1–0. It was WA Tlemcen's first Algerian Cup in its history.

Quarter-finals

Semi-finals

Final

Champions

External links
 1997/98 Coupe Nationale

Algerian Cup
Algerian Cup
Algerian Cup